Acanthogonatus hualpen is a mygalomorph spider of Chile, named after its type locality: Hualpén, Concepción, Bío Bío Region. Males can be distinguished from those of A. nahuelbuta and A. patagallina by the shaped of the bulb's apex, and by the palpal tibia being wide in the basal two-thirds (tapering abruptly at the apex) with thickened setae along the apical one-third of the retrolateral face (instead of two-thirds).

Description
Male: total length ; cephalothorax length , width ; cephalic region length , width ; medial ocular quadrangle (OQ) length , width ; labium length , width ; sternum length , width . Its labium and maxillae possess no cuspules; its maxillae have thickened setae on their anterior inner corner. A serrula is present. Its sternum and sigilla resemble those in A. nahuelbuta. Chelicerae: rastellum is absent. Cheliceral tumescence is small, with a ventral protuberance. Leg I and its tibial apophysis is similar to that of A. Nahuelbuta, while its metatarsus is straight. Its color is also as in A. Nahuelbuta.
Female: total length ; cephalothorax length , width ; cephalic region length , width ; fovea width ; OQ length , width ; labium length , width ;sternum length , width . Its cephalic region is convex, with the fovea slightly procurved. Its labium possesses 1 cuspule. A well-developed serrula is present. Its sternal sigilla is small, shallow and marginal. Chelicerae: rastellum is absent. Color as in male.

Distribution
Only in its type locality.

References

External links

 ADW entry

Pycnothelidae
Spiders of South America
Spiders described in 1995
Endemic fauna of Chile